Stanningley is a district of Pudsey, West Yorkshire, England. The appropriate Leeds Metropolitan Ward is Bramley and Stanningley. The parish is part of the Anglican Diocese of Leeds.

History 
 The parish church of St Thomas was built in 1841 in Neo-Norman style and is now Grade II listed. It was designed by H. Rogerson. The foundation stone was laid on 5 November 1839, by John Farrar of Pudsey. The organ chamber and vestry were added in 1870. There are examples of stained glass dating to the 1860s and painted panels from the late 1880s. There is a notable marble memorial to John Butler of West Royd, d.1884 which was erected by the men of the Stanningley Ironworks where he was the manager.

St Paul's Parish Church was constructed in 1853 and its register started in 1856. The last burial at the church took place in 1939 before it was closed in 1982 as the parish was merged with Pudsey's St Lawrence Parish. After the closure, the building was converted into an office space and used by companies like Rockstar Leeds, a video game developer. As of December 2018, the building is privately owned.

 In 1894, the park lodge at Stanningley Park was built. It has the coat of arms of Leeds mounted on the park side of the house. The park once had a greenhouse.

The distinctive 1920s Pavilion Picture House was opened in February 1920. It was designed by J. P. Crawford of Albion Place. The first film shown was Daddy-Long-Legs starring Mary Pickford. In 1970, the cinema closed and it was turned into a bingo hall, before becoming a business centre c. 2005 and private accommodation c. 2020.

F & T Kitchin and Co.

Stanningley is the home of the unique Bootie Folding Cycle. It was made by a local engineering firm, F & T Kitchin & Co, at their Vickersdale works as a sideline to their main business. Production of the Bootie bicycle began in 1965 and continued with only minor refinements until early 1973.

UK's first High Occupancy Vehicle Lane
A section of the A647 road Stanningley Road and Stanningley By-Pass became the UK's first High Occupancy Vehicle Lane in 1998. It began on a trial basis and was made permanent after proving successful.

This part of the route between Leeds and Bradford experienced high levels of traffic congestion and there were few public transport priority measures. The council originally wanted to install a bus lane, but found that bus service frequencies were too low to justify it.

The project was part of an EU research project called Increasing CAR Occupancy (ICARO). Its objectives were to increase car occupancy by encouraging car sharing and to demonstrate the feasibility of providing a lane for shared use by buses, other high occupancy vehicles, motorcycles and cycles.

Economy 
Town Street and a section of Stanningley Road to the east are home to most of the district's shops, pubs and eateries. Amenities include a dry cleaners, butcher, newsagent, salon and car garage. There are 10 public houses in Stanningley, including The Jug & Barrel, Waggon & Horses and The Great Northern. The historic pub The Halfway House is on the corner of Broad Lane and Leeds and Bradford Road. A photo in the Leodis archive shows the pub in the 1950s.

Owlcotes Shopping Centre, in Stanningley, contains an Asda supermarket and a Marks & Spencer store.

Stanningley Rugby Club (SARLC)
Stanningley is the home of Stanningley SARLC, which has provided numerous players to the professional ranks. These including England captain Jamie Peacock, Jamie Jones-Buchanan, Ryan Atkins, Ash Gibson, Garreth Carvell, Michael Banks, Andy Bastow, Steve Nicholson, Mark Wilson and Roy Dickinson. The club provides facilities for 20 teams for male and females of all ages. The 1st team play in the National Conference League. The club also provides a home for Leeds Rhinos academies.

See also
Listed buildings in Calverley and Farsley
Listed buildings in Leeds (Bramley and Stanningley Ward)

References and notes

External links

 Bootie Folding Cycle
 "Bootie Folding Cycle" Information on Bootie Folding Cycle with rebuild photos
Stanningley: St Thomas'; a Church Near You
 "Why I can't find my family in Stanningley ?" Problems with finding archive information about Stanningley Calverley.info
 

Places in Leeds
Pudsey